Notonectidae is a cosmopolitan family of aquatic insects in the order Hemiptera, commonly called backswimmers because they swim "upside down" (inverted). They are similar in appearance to Corixidae (water boatmen), but can be separated by differences in their dorsal-ventral coloration, front legs, and predatory behavior. Their dorsum is convex, lightly colored without cross striations. Their front tarsi are not scoop-shaped and their hind legs are fringed for swimming. There are about 350 species in two subfamilies: Notonectinae with seven genera, and Anisopinae with four genera. Members in the former subfamily are often larger than those in the latter.

Backswimmers swim on their backs, vigorously paddling with their long, hair-fringed hind legs and attack prey as large as tadpoles and small fish. They can inflict a painful "bite" on a human being, actually a stab with their sharp tubular mouthparts (proboscis). They inhabit still freshwater, e.g. lakes, ponds, marshes, and are sometimes found in garden ponds and even swimming pools. Although primarily aquatic, they can fly well and so can disperse easily to new habitats.

The common backswimmer, N. glauca, is widespread in Europe, including the United Kingdom where it is known as the greater water boatman. Another of the same region, N. maculata, is distinguished by its mottled brick-coloured forewings.

In contrast to other aquatic insects that cling to submerged objects, Anisops deanei uses a unique system to stay submerged: using the extra oxygen supply from haemoglobin in their abdomen, instead of using oxygen dissolved in the water. The size of these air bubbles, which provide buoyancy, changes as the nitrogen dissolves into the blood and the oxygen is used in respiration.  This allows for regulation of the size of the air bubbles and their concentration of oxygen.

Notes

References
Chinery, M. (1986). Collins Guide to the Insects of Britain & Western Europe. Collins. .
Fitter, R. & Manuel, R. (1986). Collins Field Guide to Freshwater Life. Collins. .
Hungerford, H. B. (1933). The genus Notonecta of the world. U. Kansas Sci. Bull. 21: 5-195.6+516+2kkig
Painful bug bite, Williams 1980, Hawking & Smith 1997 
Notonectidae, Australian Freshwater Invertebrates

External links

Notonectidae, BugGuide
Close-up photo by J. Hlasek
Photo of Anisops assimilis swimming by Paddy Ryan
BBC Radio special on the sounds made by water boatmen

 
Nepomorpha
Heteroptera families